In mathematics, a double Mersenne number is a Mersenne number of the form

where p is prime.

Examples 
The first four terms of the sequence of double Mersenne numbers are :

Double Mersenne primes 

A double Mersenne number that is prime is called a double Mersenne prime. Since a Mersenne number Mp can be prime only if p is prime, (see Mersenne prime for a proof), a double Mersenne number  can be prime only if Mp is itself a Mersenne prime. For the first values of p for which Mp is prime,  is known to be prime for p = 2, 3, 5, 7 while explicit factors of  have been found for p = 13, 17, 19, and 31.

Being approximately 1.695,
this number is far too large for any currently known primality test. It has no prime factor below 1 × 1036.
There are probably no other double Mersenne primes than the four known.

7, 127, 2147483647, 170141183460469231731687303715884105727, 47, 338193759479, 231733529, 62914441, 2351, 1399, 295257526626031, 18287, 106937, 863, 4703, 138863, 22590223644617, ... (next term is > 1 × 1036)

Catalan–Mersenne number conjecture

The recursively defined sequence
 
 
is called the sequence of Catalan–Mersenne numbers. The first terms of the sequence  are: 

Catalan conjectured that they are prime "up to a certain limit". Although the first five terms are prime, no known methods can prove that any further terms are prime (in any reasonable time) simply because they are too huge. However, if  is not prime, there is a chance to discover this by computing  modulo some small prime  (using recursive modular exponentiation). Since  is a Mersenne number, such a prime factor  would have to be of the form . Additionally, because  is composite when  is composite, the discovery of a composite term in the sequence would preclude the possibility of any further primes in the sequence.

In popular culture
In the Futurama movie The Beast with a Billion Backs, the double Mersenne number  is briefly seen in "an elementary proof of the Goldbach conjecture". In the movie, this number is known as a "martian prime".

See also
 Cunningham chain
 Double exponential function
 Fermat number
 Perfect number
 Wieferich prime

References

Further reading
.

External links 
 
 Tony Forbes, A search for a factor of MM61.
 Status of the factorization of double Mersenne numbers
 Double Mersennes Prime Search
 Operazione Doppi Mersennes

Integer sequences
Large integers
Unsolved problems in number theory
Mersenne primes